Rocco Salomone (January 17, 1965 – February 4, 2015) was an American football coach.  He served as the head football coach at The College at Brockport, State University of New York in Brockport, New York from 1995 to 2012, where he completed a record of 103–80–1.

Salomone was a Brockport graduate who had previously served as an assistant coach at his alma mater.

Salomone also spent one season in 2014 as the defensive coordinator at Susquehanna University in Selinsgrove, Pennsylvania.

Head coaching record

References

1965 births
2015 deaths
Brockport Golden Eagles football coaches
Susquehanna River Hawks football coaches
High school football coaches in Pennsylvania
State University of New York at Brockport alumni
People from Silver Spring, Maryland